Wastedo is an unincorporated community in Leon Township, Goodhue County, Minnesota, United States.

The community is located at the junction of U.S. Highway 52, 380th Street (County Road 9), and 90th Avenue.

Nearby places include Cannon Falls, Hader, and Zumbrota.

Wastedo was settled in 1856.  The community had a post office from 1857 until 1903.

References

Unincorporated communities in Minnesota
Unincorporated communities in Goodhue County, Minnesota
1856 establishments in Minnesota Territory
Populated places established in 1856